Komediantka may refer to:
 Komediantka (book), a 1896 Polish book (:pl:Komediantka (powieść))
 Comedienne (film), a  1923 Soviet film